Detective Investigation Files (刑事偵緝檔案) is a TV series in Hong Kong about detectives, produced by TVB. The series had four installments, spanning from 1995 to 1999. It's believed that the entire franchise is a blatant ripoff of the many Japanese detective fiction.

Cast
The first (1995), second (1995), and third (1997) installments starring:
Michael Tao Dai Yu
Joey Leung Wing Chung
Kenix Kwok Ho Ying
Louisa So Yuk Wah

The fourth installment (1999) is a complete reboot of the series, with new cast led by: 
Louis Koo Tin Lok
Sunny Chan Kam Hung
Jessica Hester Hsuan
Charmaine Sheh Shi Man
Lee San San

Availability
The VCDs of Detective Investigation Files I - IV are now available worldwide.

TVB dramas